Spring Creek is a tributary of the Little Kanawha River in western West Virginia in the United States.

The lake was constructed in 1974 and is owned by the city of Spencer; it is operated as a recreation area for boating, fishing, hiking, biking, and camping.

According to the West Virginia Department of Environmental Protection, approximately 79.5% of the Spring Creek watershed is forested, mostly deciduous.  Approximately 18.7% is used for pasture and agriculture.

See also
List of rivers of West Virginia

References 

Rivers of West Virginia
Little Kanawha River
Rivers of Roane County, West Virginia
Rivers of Wirt County, West Virginia